HD 224355, also known as V1022 Cassiopeiae, HR 9059 and (in early publications) Boss 6148, is an eclipsing binary star in the constellation Cassiopeia. It ranges in apparent magnitude from 5.57 to 5.68, which means it is faintly visible to the naked eye for an observer located well away from city lights. It is one of the few binaries known to be an astrometric, spectroscopic and eclipsing binary, a combination that allows the parameters of the stellar system to be calculated with high accuracy.

HD 224355 was discovered to be a spectroscopic binary by Harry Hemley Plaskett of the DAO, in 1919. Many additional spectra were obtained at the DAO in 1922, and orbital elements of the binary were first published in 1923. The orbit was found to have a significant eccentricity of 0.278. Because the physical separation of spectroscopic binaries is often relatively small, they are good candidates to be eclipsing binaries. For that reason, in 1924 Joel Stebbins included HD 224355 in an early photo-electric photometry study, and observed a "suspect eclipse". That led to the star being listed in the New Catalogue of Suspected Variable Stars as NSV 14773. Hipparcos data confirmed that HD 224355 is an Algol-type eclipsing binary. In 2008 it was given the variable star designation V1022 Cassiopeiae.

From 2014 through 2017, HD 224355 was observed with the CHARA optical interferometer. Those observations allowed the orbit to be directly traced from the changes of the stars' relative positions on the sky. That orbit, when combined with radial velocity information, provided a distance measurement to the star.  The value obtained, agrees well with the value of  measured by the Gaia spacecraft using the completely independent method of stellar parallax.

Both components of the HD 224355 system are slightly more massive than the Sun, F5 or F6 stars 1.9 billion years old and right at the end of their main sequence lives.

References

Algol variables
Cassiopeia (constellation)
118077
224355
Durchmusterung objects
Cassiopeiae, V1022